Raja Rajendra is a 2015 Kannada-language comedy film written and directed by Pon Kumaran. It stars Sharan, Ishita Dutta, Vimala Raman and P. Ravi Shankar in the stellar roles. The film marks the reunion of director Kumaran and actor Sharan after their previous venture, Jai Lalitha. Produced by Uday K. Mehta, the film released on 6 February 2015. The core plot of the movie is based on the 1990 Malayalam movie His Highness Abdullah.

Plot
This story is about a guy named Mani (Sharan), who also is an imposter of a dreaded goon named Bottle Mani (P. Ravi Shankar). Due to this he earns the wrath of bottle Mani. Alternatively, Neelakanta Raju (Ramakrishna), a member of a royal family is an old man with three daughters and a long last son. He hopes that his son and his grandson come to him one day, while his sons-in-law want him to die as soon as possible. To get the old man killed, the three sons-in-law along with Shastri (Suchendra Prasad) go to city and contact a guy who promises him to send Mani to act like grandson of Neelakanta Raju. Instead of the original bottle Mani, he fixes up Mani so that Mani could get his mother cured with the contract money.

Mani goes to palace and gains entry into household, but a being tender heart he fails to kill the old man, instead he saves the old man's life and gains his confidence. He also falls in love with Shastri's daughter in due course. The trio and Shastri, find out that Mani is different from Bottle Mani and try to expel him out of house. However, the spirit of Raja Rajendra who was father of Neelakanta Raju takes over Mani and teaches them lesson. Day after day, every night the spirit takes over Mani and starts expelling the enemies of family. This attracts the attention of police and Inspector Indrajith (Sadhu Kokila) comes to investigate the issue.

The trio hire a black magician to seal the spirit of Raja Rajendra in a bottle and become successful. The spirit gets released when Indrajith discards the bottle by mistake. Unknowingly, Shastri's daughter requests magician to give the spirit of RR, and he gets confused as the bottles do not have any labels. He brings along spirits of a bus conductor, kabaddi player, independence activist and drama artists.

What follows is the laughter riot in climax where all these spirits take over different people there and how Mani wins over the trio.

Cast
 Sharan as Mani and Raja Rajendra (dual role)
 Ishita Dutta as Swathi, Shastri's daughter, Mani's love interest
 Vimala Raman as Yamuna, Raja Rajendra's wife
 Ramakrishna as Neelakanta Raju, Raja Rajendra's son
 Sadhu Kokila as Inspector Indrajith
 Srinivasa Murthy as a music teacher, Neelakanta Raju's childhood friend
 P. Ravi Shankar as Bottle Mani
 Neenasam Ashwath as Neelakanta Raju's third son-in-law
 Suhas Girish
 Tabla Nani
 Lakshmi Siddaiah
 Suchendra Prasad as Shastri, Swathi's father
 Rekha Kumar
 Nurse Jayalakshmi as Inspector Indrajith's wife
Kuri prathap as Black magician

Production
Pon Kumaran who previously worked with Sharan in the comedy film Jai Lalitha had mutually agreed to do a mythological comedy film prior to the film's release. The film took off during July 2014 and quickly completed the filming process in and around Mysore and Bangalore locales. It was earlier reported that Sridhar V. Sambhram who composed music for Jai Lalitha would compose for this film as well. However, later Arjun Janya was hired to tune the music. Television actress Ishita Dutta was hired to play one of the leads opposite Sharan. Another popular south Indian actress Vimala Raman, who earlier acted in the blockbuster Aptharakshaka, was hired to play the second lead and joined the team on 15 November 2014 to shoot for her scenes.

Soundtrack

Arjun Janya has composed the background score and music for the film's soundtrack. Actor Sharan made his debut in singing with this film. The album consists of four tracks, the lyrics for which penned by K. Kalyan, V. Nagendra Prasad and Yogaraj Bhat.

Release
The film censored with 'U' certificate is all set to release on 6 February 2015.

Critical reception
"Desimartini" rated it 3/5. Sreeja Sreedharan of Desimartini described the movie as "Sit back, laugh it off and take notice of Sharan.The film has the perfect length and editing is crisp. Cinematography captures the mood well while the director should concentrated a little more on the wide-angle shots which sometimes look bare. This is the perfect film to enjoy your weekend and there is no doubt that Sharan has a new hit on his hands. P Kumar has managed to get together a simple story and transform it into wholesome entertainment. He wins as the story writer and director. "

References

External links
 
 
 'Raja Rajendra' CD comes

2015 films
Indian comedy films
2015 comedy films
2010s Kannada-language films
Films scored by Arjun Janya
Films directed by Pon Kumaran